Michele Santucci (born 30 May 1989) is an Italian swimmer.  He competed for Italy in the men's 4 x 100 m freestyle relay at the 2008, 2012 and 2016 Olympics.

See also
 Italy at the 2012 Summer Olympics - Swimming

References

External links
 

1989 births
Living people
Italian male swimmers
Swimmers at the 2008 Summer Olympics
Swimmers at the 2012 Summer Olympics
Swimmers at the 2016 Summer Olympics
Italian male freestyle swimmers
Olympic swimmers of Italy
Medalists at the FINA World Swimming Championships (25 m)
European Aquatics Championships medalists in swimming
World Aquatics Championships medalists in swimming
Universiade medalists in swimming
Universiade silver medalists for Italy
Sportspeople from Arezzo
Swimmers of Fiamme Azzurre
Medalists at the 2009 Summer Universiade
Medalists at the 2013 Summer Universiade
People from Castiglion Fiorentino